The 73rd Golden Globe Awards honored the best in film and American television of 2015. It was broadcast live on January 10, 2016, from The Beverly Hilton in Beverly Hills, California beginning at 5:00 p.m. PST / 8:00 p.m. EST by NBC. The ceremony was produced by Dick Clark Productions in association with the Hollywood Foreign Press Association. The nominations were announced on December 10, 2015, at The Beverly Hilton by Angela Bassett, America Ferrera, Chloë Grace Moretz, and Dennis Quaid. Denzel Washington was announced as the Cecil B. DeMille Lifetime Achievement Award honoree on November 16, 2015. Ricky Gervais hosted the show for the fourth time. The Martian, Mozart in the Jungle, Mr. Robot, The Revenant, and Steve Jobs were among the films and television shows that received multiple awards.

Winners and nominees

These are the nominees for the 73rd Golden Globe Awards. Winners are listed at the top of each list.

Film

Films with multiple nominations
The following 16 films received multiple nominations:

Films with multiple wins
The following 3 films received multiple wins:

Television

Series with multiple nominations
The following 13 series received multiple nominations:

Series with multiple wins
The following 2 series received multiple wins:

Presenters
The Hollywood Foreign Press announced the following presenters:

 Amy Adams with Best Actor in a Motion Picture – Musical or Comedy
 Jaimie Alexander and Amber Heard with Best Actor – Miniseries or Television Film
 Patricia Arquette and J. K. Simmons with Best Supporting Actor – Motion Picture
 Jennifer Lawrence and Amy Schumer introduced Joy and Trainwreck
 Melissa Benoist and Grant Gustin with Best Actor in a Television Series – Comedy or Musical
 Orlando Bloom and Bryce Dallas Howard with Best Miniseries or Television Film
 Kate Bosworth and Sophia Bush with Best Actress in a Television Series – Drama
 Gerard Butler and Helen Mirren with Best Foreign Language Film
 Jim Carrey with Best Motion Picture – Musical or Comedy
 Matt Damon introduced The Martian
 Viola Davis introduced Carol
 Chris Evans introduced Spotlight
 Paul Feig, Melissa McCarthy, and Jason Statham introduced Spy
 Will Ferrell and Mark Wahlberg with Best Screenplay
 America Ferrera and Eva Longoria with Best Actor in a Television Series – Drama
 Harrison Ford with Best Motion Picture – Drama
 Tom Ford and Lady Gaga with Best Supporting Actor – Series, Miniseries or Television Film
 Jamie Foxx and Lily James with intro of Miss Golden Globe and Best Original Score
 Morgan Freeman with Best Director – Motion Picture
 Mel Gibson introduced Mad Max: Fury Road
 Ryan Gosling and Brad Pitt introduced The Big Short
 Maggie Gyllenhaal introduced Room
 Tom Hanks with Cecil B. DeMille Award
 Kevin Hart and Ken Jeong with Best Actress – Miniseries or Television Film
 Taraji P. Henson and Terrence Howard with Best Television Series – Comedy or Musical
 Jonah Hill and Channing Tatum with Best Supporting Actress – Motion Picture
 Kate Hudson and Kurt Russell with Best Animated Feature Film
 Dwayne Johnson and Jennifer Lopez with Best Supporting Actress – Series, Miniseries or Television Film
 Michael Keaton with Best Actress in a Motion Picture – Musical or Comedy
 John Krasinski and Olivia Wilde with Best Television Series – Drama
 Tobey Maguire introduced The Revenant
 Julianne Moore with Best Actor in a Motion Picture – Drama
 Katy Perry with Best Original Song
 Eddie Redmayne with Best Actress in a Motion Picture – Drama
 Andy Samberg with Best Actor in a Television Series – Comedy or Musical

Reception
The show received mixed to negative reviews, with the critics panning host Ricky Gervais's jokes as well as lack of energy in ceremony. Writing for The Washington Post, Hank Stuever heavily criticised the ceremony saying, "We ask for the worst, so we get the worst", and went on to say "Gervais acted like he was the one being made to suffer, but truly this misery is shared all around." Daniel D'Addario of Times also felt that the show was a "bore" and said, "By the Globes' own standard, this year's show felt unbearably bogged down." However, The New York Times James Poniewozik reviewed the ceremony moderately saying: "A well-run, fun Globes — privileged people toasting their terrific success with bottomless Moët — is its own corrective to Hollywood self-seriousness. Whereas the planned transgression of this one was less a stiff shot than small beer." The ceremony was nominated for the Writers Guild of America Award for Best Comedy/Variety (Music, Awards, Tributes) – Specials, but lost out to Triumph's Election Special 2016.

Ratings
The ceremony averaged a Nielsen 5.5 ratings/13 share, and was watched by 18.5 million viewers. The ratings was an eleven percent decline from the previous ceremony's viewership of 19.3 million, the second highest in a decade.

See also
 21st Critics' Choice Awards
 22nd Screen Actors Guild Awards
 36th Golden Raspberry Awards
 69th British Academy Film Awards
 88th Academy Awards

References

External links
 
 Golden Globes 2016
 
 

Golden Globe
Golden Globe
Golden Globe
073
Golden Globe
January 2016 events in the United States